The fire loading of a building or compartment is a way of establishing the potential severity of a hypothetical future fire. It is the heat output per unit floor area, often in kJ/m2, calculated from the calorific value of the materials present. Fire loading is used for evaluating industrial safety risks.

An empty room with cement floor and ceiling, cinderblock walls, and no flammable materials would have approximately zero fire loading; any fire entering such a room from elsewhere will find nothing to feed on. However, nearly anything that makes a room useful (such as furniture, electrical appliances, or computer equipment), or attractive (such as wood panelling, acoustic tile, carpeting, curtains, or wall decorations), will increase the fire loading.  Some usages inherently carry high fire loading as a side effect (an art gallery and studio, for example, is likely to contain large amounts of canvas, paints, solvents, and wooden framing).  Buildings under construction or renovation tend to carry high fire loads in the form of construction materials, solvents, and fuel for generators.

One reason to determine fire loading is to determine the need for and the capacity of possible safety measures, such as ensuring adequate fire detection and evacuation, or installation of a fire sprinkler system or other fire suppression system.

References 

Firefighting